André Holland (born December 28, 1979) is an American actor, widely known for his 2016 performance as Kevin in the Academy Award-winning film Moonlight.

Throughout his career, Holland has acted in film, television, and theatre productions. On television, he has starred as Dr. Algernon Edwards in the Cinemax series The Knick (2014–2015) and as Matt Miller in the FX series American Horror Story: Roanoke (2016). He portrayed politician and activist Andrew Young in the 2014 film Selma and sportswriter Wendell Smith in the 2013 film 42. On stage, he has starred in August Wilson's play Jitney on Broadway in 2017. In 2020, he plays a lead role on the Netflix musical drama series The Eddy, directed by Damien Chazelle.

Early life
Holland was born and raised in Bessemer, Alabama. He graduated from John Carroll Catholic High School. His first stage performance was in a production of Oliver! at the Birmingham Summerfest Theatre, at the age of eleven.

He attended Florida State University and studied abroad at the FSU London study centre during his time there. He also received a Master of Fine Arts degree from New York University in 2006.

Career

2006–2015: Early work 
Holland's first on-screen performance was in an episode of Law & Order in 2006. Around this time, Holland began to perform more regularly on stage as well. In 2006, he portrayed three characters in the play Blue Door. Charles Isherwood of The New York Times gave his performance a positive review.

In 2008, he played Eric in the play Wig Out! and took his first film role in the sports drama Sugar. The following year, he portrayed Elegba and Marcus in The Brother/Sister Plays. In 2010, he was cast in the Matthew Lopez play The Whipping Man, for which he won the Vivian Robinson/Audelco Award for Best Supporting Actor.

In 2011, he starred as Julian "Fitz" Fitzgerald in several episodes of the NBC sitcom Friends with Benefits. In 2013, he portrayed Wendell Smith in the film 42. In 2014, he portrayed Andrew Young in Ava DuVernay's historical drama film Selma. For his performance, he was nominated for the NAACP Image Award for Outstanding Supporting Actor in a Motion Picture.

From 2014 to 2015, he starred in a supporting role opposite Clive Owen in the Cinemax original drama series The Knick.

2016–present: Moonlight and beyond 

In 2016, he achieved widespread notice for his performance as Kevin in Barry Jenkins' drama film Moonlight, for which he received critical acclaim and numerous accolades. The film won several Academy Awards, including Best Picture, at the 89th annual ceremony.

Holland's performance was singled out by some film critics, including those at Rolling Stone and GQ, who dubbed him a "standout" in the film. As a member of the film's ensemble cast, he received a nomination for Outstanding Performance by a Cast in a Motion Picture at the 23rd Screen Actors Guild Awards. He also received nominations for Best Supporting Actor from the Florida Film Critics Circle and Outstanding Supporting Actor at the Black Reel Awards.

Following the success of Moonlight, in 2017, Holland portrayed Youngblood in August Wilson's play Jitney on Broadway. He next appeared in DuVernay's fantasy adventure film A Wrinkle in Time, released in March 2018. The film received mixed reviews from critics. Later that year, he portrayed the leading character Henry Matthew Deaver on the Hulu series Castle Rock; his turn on the series has earned positive reviews from critics, including Amy Woolsey of Vulture, who praised his performance as "textured."

Since July 2018, he has starred in a production of Othello at Shakespeare's Globe, costarring with Mark Rylance. In 2018, he also made his Off Off Broadway directing debut with a production of Greg Keller's Dutch Masters.

In 2022, Holland was cast as Paul Cole in Duke Johnson's upcoming film The Actor, based on the novel Memory by Donald E. Westlake.

Filmography

Film

Television

References

External links
 

1979 births
21st-century American male actors
African-American male actors
American male film actors
American male television actors
Florida State University alumni
Living people
Male actors from Alabama
New York University alumni
People from Bessemer, Alabama
21st-century African-American people
20th-century African-American people